Merdan Gurbanow (born 30 August 1991) is a Turkmen professional footballer. As of 2020, he plays for Nebitçi FT.

International career
Gurbanow made his senior national team debut on 5 September 2017 against Singapore.

References

External links 
 
 

1991 births
Living people
Turkmenistan footballers
Association football midfielders
Turkmenistan international footballers
Turkmenistan expatriate footballers
Expatriate footballers in Belarus
Turkmenistan expatriate sportspeople in Belarus
FC Ahal players
FC Aşgabat players
FC Dnepr Mogilev players
2019 AFC Asian Cup players